Qatar – Sudan relations are the bilateral relations between the State of Qatar and the Republic of the Sudan. Relations were first established in 1972, when Qatar inaugurated its embassy in Sudan's capital city, Khartoum.

Diplomatic representation
Qatar maintains an embassy on Doha Street, located in the El Manshiya Area of Sudan's capital city Khartoum, while Sudan has an embassy in the Diplomatic Area of Doha, Qatar.

Diplomatic visits
Sudanese president Omar al-Bashir paid an official visit to Qatar in October 2017 to discuss ways in which to further develop bilateral ties.

Diplomatic cooperation

Political
In 2009, Qatar, with the help of Libya, hosted and mediated discussions between Sudan and Chad, who were at odds over allegations of their respective governments providing support to opposition groups within each other's countries since 2005.

A peace agreement between the Sudanese government and the Liberation and Justice Movement, a Darfur-based rebel group, was mediated by Qatar in 2011. The deal stipulated financial aid from Qatar and several other donors. Another peace agreement was concluded with the help of Qatar in 2013, between Sudan's government and the Justice and Equality Movement.

2017–18 Qatar diplomatic crisis

On 5 June 2017, a number of states led by Saudi Arabia cut ties with and imposed a boycott on Qatar. Despite being largely dependent on financial support from the countries which spearheaded the boycott, Sudan declined to align itself with the Saudi-led bloc, as Qatar was also a major financier and political supporter of Sudan. On the same day that the row erupted, the Sudanese government relayed its concerns about the developing crisis and volunteered to mediate discussions between all parties. With one of the core reasons for the boycott being Qatar's ties to Islamist groups such as the Muslim Brotherhood, Sudan, who has a history of expressing support for similar groups, had internal pressure from Islamist politicians to side with Qatar. This was exemplified by the Popular Congress Party's secretary general Ali al-Haj Mohamed, who condemned the Saudi bloc's publishing of a list of alleged terrorists with ties to Qatar, many of whom were connected to the Muslim Brotherhood.

Economic
Qatar is among the largest Arab investors in Sudan. Qatari Diar announced the Mushairab project in Sudan in 2006,
which would witness substantial real estate development spread over an area of 206,000 sq meters at a cost of $400 million, with construction starting in 2009. Hassad Food, a Qatari agricultural company, signed a $1 billion deal in 2009 to lease farmland in Sudan. In late 2017, it was announced that Qatar Mining Company would be investing $1 billion in Sudan. During the same period, QNB Group was reported as operating 14 branches across Sudan.

Cultural
In an effort to promote tourism in Sudan, Qatar Museums, on behalf of the Qatari government, launched the Qatar-Sudan Archaeological Project (QSAP) in 2012. As of 2017, the project has funded 42 archaeological missions with a sum of $50 million. Sudan also received $135 million from Qatar in 2014, to be allotted towards the financing of 29 archaeological projects in the country.

Foreign aid
To help alleviate the poor living conditions and provide housing for displaced peoples and refugees in Sudan's Darfur region, a deal was reached in 2017 between the government of Sudan and the Qatar Fund for Development in which $70 million would be allocated to construct model villages in the region.

Migration
An estimated 60,000 Sudanese expatriates reside in Qatar. As one of the earliest national groups to migrate to Qatar, many of the country's civil society positions were filled by Sudanese citizens in its pre-independence years. There is a Sudanese school in Qatar located in the Abu Hamour area of Doha with upwards of 1,800 students enrolled.

See also 
 Foreign relations of Qatar
 Foreign relations of Sudan

References

 
Sudan
Qatar